Poniou or Ponjou is a hamlet west of Zennor in west  Cornwall, England. The name is from Cornish "ponjow" meaning "bridges".

References

Hamlets in Cornwall
Zennor